Lopatnitsy is a rural locality (a selo) in Seletskoye Rural Settlement, Suzdalsky District, Vladimir Oblast, Russia. The population was 235 as of 2010. There are 3 streets.

Geography 
Lopatnitsy is located on the Podeks River, 15 km northeast of Suzdal (the district's administrative centre) by road. Krasnogvardeysky is the nearest rural locality.

References 

Rural localities in Suzdalsky District